is a passenger railway station in located in the city of Kumano, Mie Prefecture, Japan, operated by Central Japan Railway Company (JR Tōkai).

Lines

Station layout
The station consists of a single island platform connected to the small station building, which dates from the opening of the line, by a barrier-protected pedestrian level crossing. The station is unattended.

Platforms

History 
Atashika Station opened on 1 April 1956, as a station on the Japan National Railways (JNR) Kisei-Nishi Line. The line was renamed the Kisei Main Line on 15 July 1959.  The station has been unattended since 1 November 1986. The station was absorbed into the JR Central network upon the privatization of the JNR on 1 April 1987.

Passenger statistics
In fiscal 2019, the station was used by an average of 47 passengers daily (boarding passengers only).

Surrounding area
Atashika beach
 Kumano City Hall Atashika Branch Office
Kumano City Atashika Elementary School
 Kumano City Shinka Junior High School

See also
List of railway stations in Japan

References

External links

 JR Central timetable 

Railway stations in Japan opened in 1956
Railway stations in Mie Prefecture
Kumano, Mie